Matt Gallagher (born 1960s) is an Irish former Gaelic footballer who played for Aodh Ruadh and, later, Naomh Bríd, as well as the Donegal county team.

For many years he was Donegal's most capped player until Brian Roper broke his record.

In April 1980, his secondary school De La Salle College Ballyshannon, defeated Leinster champions St Mary's CBS, Portlaoise, by 2–10 to 1–6 to win the All-Ireland Colleges B title at Croke Park, with Gallagher playing in the final.

Gallagher won the 1982 All-Ireland Under-21 Football Championship with Donegal, with his brother Pauric also on the team. Pauric was kilt in a car crash in the U.S. in 1989.

Matt Gallagher played for Donegal from 1981 until 1995. He came down with appendicitis in 1983, causing him to miss Donegal's victory over Cavan in the Ulster final and the All-Ireland semi-final.

He fell out with manager Tom Conaghan during the 1980s. He missed the 1989 Ulster SFC final. Brian McEniff restored him to the team in time for the 1990 Ulster SFC, and Gallagher played against Armagh in the 1990 Ulster final, won by Donegal.

He was a key member of the county's 1992 All-Ireland Senior Football Championship winning team. A utility player often deployed as a defender, he started at full-back in the 1992 All-Ireland Senior Football Championship Final in which Donegal defeated Dublin by a scoreline of 0-18 to 0-14. Later that year he won an All Star for his performances in that campaign.

He played his club football for Aodh Ruadh and, later, Naomh Bríd.

After retiring from inter-county football in 1997, he joined then manager Declan Bonner's backroom team. He was also briefly served under McEniff in 2003. He has also managed Naomh Bríd.

Honours
 All-Ireland Senior Football Championship: 1992
 Ulster Senior Football Championship: 1990, 1992
 All-Ireland Under-21 Football Championship: 1982
 Ulster Under-21 Football Championship: 1982?
 Silver Jubilee Football Team of the Ulster GAA Writers Association (UGAAWA) nomination: 2012

See also
 List of All Stars Awards winners (football)

References

External links
 Matt Gallagher at GAAinfo.com

1960s births
Living people
Aodh Ruadh Gaelic footballers
Donegal inter-county Gaelic footballers
Gaelic football managers
Gaelic football selectors
Gaelic football utility players
Naomh Bríd Gaelic footballers
People educated at De La Salle College Ballyshannon
Winners of one All-Ireland medal (Gaelic football)